"I'd Still Want You" is a song written and recorded by Hank Williams and released on MGM Records.  It was selected to be the B-side to the up-tempo "Baby, We're Really in Love."  Williams biographer Colin Escott calls it "another bleak commentary on Hank's continuing need for Audrey [Williams, his wife] as she closed off her heart to him." It was recorded at Castle Studio in Nashville on July 25, 1951 with Fred Rose producing and backing from Don Helms (steel guitar), Jerry Rivers (fiddle), Sammy Pruett (lead guitar), Howard Watts (bass) and probably Jack Shook (rhythm guitar).

References

1951 songs
Songs written by Hank Williams
Hank Williams songs
Song recordings produced by Fred Rose (songwriter)